The 2011 Rally México was the second round of the 2011 World Rally Championship season. It was the season's first event held on gravel roads. The rally took place over 3–6 March, beginning with a street stage in Guanajuato. The rally was also the first round of the Super 2000 World Rally Championship.

In an event in which all the leading contenders suffered some sort of trouble during the rally, Sébastien Loeb took the 63rd WRC win of his career, and his fifth victory in Mexico, taking advantage of teammate Sébastien Ogier's crash on the 20th stage and held on to win the event by over 90 seconds. Loeb had trailed Ogier heading into the final day, having picked up a 50-second penalty for starting the 15th stage late. Second place went to championship leader Mikko Hirvonen, who took the Power Stage victory, to take his total points earned on the rally to 21; while teammate Jari-Matti Latvala finished third, despite losing over four minutes on Friday. The Norwegian trio of Petter Solberg, Mads Østberg and Henning Solberg finished in fourth, fifth and sixth place respectively.

Nasser Al-Attiyah won the supporting SWRC class on the road, but was later excluded due to a technical infringement. Al-Attiyah's exclusion gave Martin Prokop victory in the class and seventh place overall, Juho Hänninen second in class and eighth overall, with Ott Tänak promoted onto the SWRC podium and into the overall points.

Results

Event standings

Special stages

Power Stage
The "Power stage" was a live, televised  stage at the end of the rally, held near Guanajuato.

Standings after the rally

Drivers' Championship standings

Manufacturers' Championship standings

References

External links
 Results at eWRC.com

Mexico
Rally Mexico
Rally